James Witherspoon may refer to:

James Hervey Witherspoon Jr. (1810–1865), Confederate States of America politician
Jim Witherspoon (born 1951), retired Canadian ice hockey defenceman
Jimmy Witherspoon (1920–1997), American blues singer